The Cimitero Acattolico (Non-Catholic Cemetery) of Rome, often referred to as the Cimitero dei protestanti (Protestant Cemetery) or Cimitero degli Inglesi (English Cemetery), is a private cemetery in the rione of Testaccio in Rome. It is near Porta San Paolo and adjacent to the Pyramid of Cestius, a small-scale Egyptian-style pyramid built between 18 and 12 BC as a tomb and later incorporated into the section of the Aurelian Walls that borders the cemetery. It has Mediterranean cypress, pomegranate and other trees, and a grassy meadow. It is the final resting place of non-Catholics including but not exclusive to Protestants or British people. The earliest known burial is that of a Dr Arthur, a Protestant medical doctor hailing from Edinburgh, in 1716. The English poets John Keats and Percy Bysshe Shelley, as well as Italian Marxist Antonio Gramsci are buried there.

History 
Since the norms of the Catholic Church forbade burying on consecrated ground non-Catholics – including Protestants, Jews and Orthodox – as well as suicides and actors (these, after death, were "expelled" by the Christian community and buried outside the walls or at the extreme edge of the same). Burials occurred at night to avoid manifestations of religious fanaticism and to preserve the safety of those who participated in the funeral rites. An exception was made for Sir Walter Synod, who in 1821 managed to bury his daughter in broad daylight and, he was accompanied by a group of guards to be protected from incursions of fanatics.

In the 18th and 19th centuries, the area of the non-Catholic cemetery was called "The meadows of the Roman people". It was an area of public property, where drovers used to graze the cattle, wine was kept in the cavities created in the so-called Monte dei Cocci, an artificial hill where the Romans went to have fun. The area was dominated by the Pyramid of Caius Cestius which for centuries was one of the most visited monuments of the city. It was the non-Catholics themselves who chose those places for their burials, and they were allowed by a decision of the Holy Office, which in 1671 consented that the "non-Catholic Lords" who died in the city were spared the shame of finding a burial together with prostitutes and sinners in the cemetery of the Muro Torto. The first burial of a Protestant was that of a follower of the exiled King James VII and II, named William Arthur, who died in Rome where he had come to escape the repressions following the defeats of the Jacobites in Scotland. Other burials followed, which did not concern only courtiers of King Stuart, who in the meanwhile had settled in Rome. It is said that in 1732 the treasurer of the King of England, William Ellis, was buried at the foot of the Pyramid. By that time the area had acquired the status of a cemetery of the British, although the people buried there were not only from the United Kingdom.

The cemetery developed without any official recognition and only at the end of 1700 the authorities started to take care of it. It was not until the 1920s that the government appointed a custodian to oversee the area and the cemetery functions. The public disinterest was mainly determined by the fact that in the current mentality, where the only burial conceived by the Catholics were the ones happening in a church, the availability of a cemetery that provided non-Catholic burials was not considered a privilege.

At the beginning of the nineteenth century in the cemetery area there was only holly, and there was no other natural nor artificial protection for the tombs scattered in the countryside, where cattle were grazing. The cypresses that adorn the cemetery today were planted later on. In 1824 a moat was erected that surrounded the ancient part of the cemetery. In ancient times crosses or inscriptions were forbidden, as in all non-Catholic cemeteries, at least until 1870.

For a long time there have been common graves divided by nations: Germany, Greece, Sweden and Romania.

As of 2011, the custody and management of the cemetery was entrusted to foreign representatives in Italy.

The great, hundred-year-old cypresses, the green meadow that surrounds part of the tombs, the white pyramid that stands behind the enclosure of Roman walls, together with the cats that walk undisturbed among the tombstones written in all the languages of the world, give to this small cemetery a peculiar aura. As in use in Anglo-Saxon cemeteries, there are no photographs on the tombstones.

Italians 
The Non-catholic Cemetery of Rome is intended for the rest of all non-Catholics, without any distinction of nationality. However, there are very few illustrious Italians buried there. They were allowed a spot in this cemetery for the alternative culture and ideas expressed in life ("foreign" compared to the dominant one), for the quality of their work, or for certain  circumstances of their life for which they were somehow "foreign" in their own country. Among them, the politicians Antonio Gramsci and Emilio Lussu, the writer and poet Dario Bellezza, the writers Carlo Emilio Gadda and Luce d'Eramo and a few others. Recently it is very rare that new burials are added. There is one exception; on 18 July 2019, the writer Andrea Camilleri was buried here.

Burials
Nicholas Stanley-Price has published an Inventory of early burials at the Non-catholic Cemetery.

John Keats 

Keats died in Rome of tuberculosis at the age of 25, and is buried in the cemetery. His epitaph, which does not mention him by name, is by his friends Joseph Severn and Charles Armitage Brown, and reads:

Percy Bysshe Shelley

Shelley drowned in 1822 in a sailing accident off the Italian Riviera. When his body washed up upon the shore, a copy of Keats's poetry borrowed from Leigh Hunt was discovered in his pocket, doubled back, as though it had been put away in a hurry. He was cremated on the beach near Viareggio by his friends, the poet Lord Byron and the English adventurer Edward John Trelawny. His ashes were sent to the British consulate in Rome, who had them interred in the Protestant Cemetery some months later.

Shelley's heart supposedly survived cremation and was snatched out of the flames by Trelawny, who subsequently gave it to Shelley's widow, Mary. When Mary Shelley died, the heart was found in her desk wrapped in the manuscript of "Adonais," the elegy Shelley had written the year before upon the death of Keats, in which the poet urges the traveller, "Go thou to Rome ...".

Shelley and Mary's three-year-old son William was also buried in the Protestant Cemetery.

Shelley's heart was finally buried, encased in silver, in 1889, with the son who survived him, Sir Percy Florence Shelley, but his gravestone in the Protestant Cemetery is inscribed: Cor cordium ("heart of hearts"), followed by a quotation from Shakespeare's The Tempest:

Other burials

 

 Arthur Aitken (1861–1924), British military commander
 Johan David Åkerblad (1763–1819), Swedish diplomat
 Walther Amelung (1865–1927), German classical archaeologist
 Hendrik Christian Andersen (1872–1940), sculptor, friend of Henry James
 Angelica Balabanoff (1878–1965), Jewish Russian-Italian communist and social democratic activist
 R. M. Ballantyne (1825–1894), Scottish novelist
 Jakob Salomon Bartholdy (1779–1825), Prussian Consul General, art patron
 Rosa Bathurst (1808–1824), drowned in the River Tiber aged 16; moving monument by Richard Westmacott
 John Bell (1763–1820), Scottish surgeon and anatomist
 Dario Bellezza (1944–1996), Italian poet, author and playwright
 Karl Julius Beloch (1854–1929), German classical and economic historian
 Martin Boyd (1893–1972), Australian novelist and autobiographer
 Pietro Boyesen (1819–1882), Danish photographer
 Karl Briullov (1799–1852), Russian painter
 Giorgio Bulgari (1890–1966), Italian businessman, grandson of Sotirios Bulgari, the founder of Bulgari
 J.B Bury (1861–1927) Anglo-Irish Historian
 Andrea Camilleri (1925–2019), Italian novelist
 Asmus Jacob Carstens (1754–1798), Danish-German painter
 Jesse Benedict Carter (1872–1917), American Classical scholar

 Enrico Coleman (1846–1911), artist and orchid-lover
 Gregory Corso (1930–2001), American beat generation poet
 Richard Henry Dana Jr. (1815–1882), American author of Two Years Before the Mast
 Luce d'Eramo (1925–2001), Italian writer
 Frances Minto Elliot (1820–1898), English writer
 Robert K. Evans (1852–1926), United States Army Brigadier General
 Robert Finch (1783–1830), English antiquary and connoisseur of the arts
 Arnoldo Foà (1916–2014), Italian actor
 Karl Philipp Fohr (1795–1818), German painter
 Maria Pia Fusco (1939–2016), Italian screenwriter and journalist
 Carlo Emilio Gadda (1893–1973), Italian novelist
 Irene Galitzine (1916–2006) fashion designer
 John Gibson (1790–1866), Welsh sculptor, student of Canova
 August von Goethe (1789–1830), son of Johann Wolfgang von Goethe; his monument features a medallion by Bertel Thorvaldsen
 Joseph Gott (1785–1860), British sculptor, son of Benjamin Gott
 Antonio Gramsci (1891–1937), Italian philosopher, leader of the Italian Communist Party
 Richard Saltonstall Greenough (1819–1904), American sculptor
 Stephen Grimes (1927–1988), British Academy Award winning production designer
 Augustus William Hare (1792–1834), English author
 William Stanley Haseltine (1835–1900), American painter and draftsman
 Johannes Carsten Hauch (1790–1872), Danish poet
 William H. Herriman (1829–1918), American art collector
 Ursula Hirschmann (1913–1991), German anti-fascist activist and an advocate of European federalism
 Wilhelm von Humboldt (1794–1803), son of the German diplomat and linguist Wilhelm von Humboldt
 Vyacheslav Ivanov (1866–1949), Russian poet, philosopher, and classical scholar
 Chauncey Ives (1810–1894), American sculptor
 Gualtiero Jacopetti (1919–2011), Italian director of documentary films
 Dobroslav Jevđević (1895–1962), Serbian World War II commander
 John Keats (1795–1821), English poet
 Lindsay Kemp (1938–2018), British dancer, actor, teacher, mime artist, and choreographer
 August Kestner (1777–1853), German diplomat and art collector
 Adolf Klügmann (1837–1880), German classical archaeologist and numismatist
 Richard Krautheimer (1897–1994), German art and architectural historian
 Antonio Labriola (1843–1904), Italian Marxist theoretician
 Belinda Lee (1935–1961), British actress
 James MacDonald, 8th baronet of Sleat (1741–1766), Scottish baronet and scholar; his tombstone was designed by G.B. Piranesi
 Hans von Marées (1837–1887), German painter
 George Perkins Marsh (1801–1882), American Minister to Italy 1861–1882, author of Man and Nature
 Richard Mason (1919–1997), British author of The World of Suzy Wong
 Malwida von Meysenbug (1816–1903), German author
 Peter Andreas Munch (1810–1863) Norwegian historian
 Hugh Andrew Johnstone Munro (1819–1885), British classical scholar
 Ernest Nash (1898–1974), German-American scholar, archaeological photographer
 E. Herbert Norman (1909–1957), Canadian diplomat and historian
 Dora Ohlfsen-Bagge (1869–1948), Australian sculptor, and her partner, Hélène de Kuegelgen (died 1948)
 D'Arcy Osborne, 12th Duke of Leeds (1884–1964), British diplomat and last Duke of Leeds
 Thomas Jefferson Page (1808–1899), commander of United States Navy expeditions exploring the Río de la Plata
 Pier Pander (1864–1919), Dutch sculptor
 Milena Pavlović-Barili (1909–1945), Serbian-Italian artist
 John Piccoli (1939–1955), son of American artists Juanita and Girolamo (Nemo) Piccoli of Anticoli Corrado
 Bruno Pontecorvo (1913–1993), Italian nuclear physicist
 G. Frederick Reinhardt (1911–1971), U.S. Ambassador to Italy, 1961–1968; administrator of this cemetery, 1961–1968
 Heinrich Reinhold (1788–1825), German painter, draughtsman, engraver; his tombstone features a medallion by Bertel Thorvaldsen
 Sarah Parker Remond (1826–1894), African American abolitionist and physician
 August Riedel (1799–1883) German artist
 Amelia Rosselli (1930–1996), Italian poet
 Peter Rockwell (1936–2020), American sculptor and son of Norman Rockwell
 Gottfried Semper (1803–1879), German architect
 Joseph Severn (1793–1879), English painter, consul in Rome, and friend of John Keats, beside whom he is buried
 Percy Bysshe Shelley (1792–1822), English poet
 Franklin Simmons (1839–1913), American sculptor and painter
 William Wetmore Story (1819–1895), American sculptor, buried beside his wife, Emelyn Story, under his own Angel of Grief
 Niklāvs Strunke (1894–1966), Latvian painter
 Pavel Svedomsky (1849–1904), Russian painter
 John Addington Symonds (1840–1893), English poet and critic
 Manfredo Tafuri (1935–1994), Italian architectural historian

 Tatiana Tolstaya (1864–1950), Russian painter and memoirist and daughter of Leo Tolstoy and Sophia Tolstaya
 Edward John Trelawny (1792–1881), English author, friend of Percy Bysshe Shelley, beside whose ashes he is buried
 Elihu Vedder (1836–1923), American painter, sculptor, graphic artist
 Shefqet Vërlaci (1877–1946), Prime Minister of Albania
 Wilhelm Friedrich Waiblinger (1804–1830), German poet and biographer of Friedrich Hölderlin
 J. Rodolfo Wilcock (1919–1978), Argentine writer, poet, critic and translator
 Friedrich Adolf Freiherr von Willisen (1798–1864), Prussian General and Ambassador to the Holy See
 Constance Fenimore Woolson (1840–1894), American novelist and short story writer, friend of Henry James
 Richard James Wyatt (1795–1860), English sculptor
 Helen Zelezny-Scholz (1882–1974), Czech-born sculptor and architectural sculptor

See also
 Old English Cemetery, Livorno
 English Cemetery, Florence

References

Further reading
 
 Antonio Menniti Ippolito, Il Cimitero acattolico di Roma. la presenza protestante nella città del papa, Roma, Viella, 2014,

External links 

 On-line database of tombs and deceased
 
 
 Cemetery website (in Italian and English)
 The Mirror of Literature, Amusement, and Instruction Volume 10, No. 285, 1 December 1827, Project Gutenberg E-text contains an article entitled "Protestant Burial-Ground at Rome"
 The Keats-Shelley House in Rome
 GPS coordinates you need to use to find the graves of famous people in the Non-Catholic Cemetery
 Elisabeth Rosenthal. "A Cemetery of Poets Is in Crisis in Rome", International Herald Tribune, 8 February 2006

Cemeteries and tombs in Rome
Anglican cemeteries in Europe
Lutheran cemeteries
Protestant Reformed cemeteries
Protestantism in Italy
Rome R. XX Testaccio